Kanwar Durga Chand (1922 – 17 May 2000) was a leader of the Bharatiya Janata Party from Himachal Pradesh. He was a member of the 6th Lok Sabha from 1977 to 1979 elected from Kangra.  He established his office  for “Lok Dal” at Palampur on NH17 in a rented accommodation of Late (Major Retd.) Ml Sharma. At present time Hotel Rongla opp. to new subji Mandi is on the same place where Shri Durga Chand ji used to have his office. He was imprisoned in the Emergency for 19 months. He was a Member of Himachal Pradesh Legislative Assembly from 1967 to 1977. He was the leader of Opposition in the assembly from 1972 to 1977. He died on 17 May 2000.

References

1922 births
2000 deaths
Bharatiya Janata Party politicians from Himachal Pradesh
State cabinet ministers of Himachal Pradesh
Bharatiya Jana Sangh politicians
India MPs 1977–1979
People from Kangra district
Indians imprisoned during the Emergency (India)
Janata Party (Secular) politicians
Himachal Pradesh MLAs 1967–1972
Himachal Pradesh MLAs 1972–1977